Bukod Kang Pinagpala (International title: Mother's Love / ) is a 2013 Philippine television drama series broadcast by GMA Network. Directed by Don Michael Perez, it stars Camille Prats and Mona Louise Rey. It premiered on February 11, 2013 on the network's Afternoon Prime line up replacing Sana ay Ikaw na Nga. The series concluded on June 7, 2013 with a total of 82 episodes. It was replaced by Maghihintay Pa Rin in its timeslot.

Premise
The series features the stories of three women whose lives and loves are hurled into a complex web of deceit, ambition, hope, and love.

Cast and characters

Lead cast
 Camille Prats as Bessilda "Bessie" Villerte-Alcuar
 Mona Louise Rey as Cindy Lara Villerte Alcuar

Supporting cast
 Jackie Rice as Janet Perez-Cheng
 Jennica Garcia as Ofelia "Ofe" Almazan-Alfonso 
 Mark Anthony Fernandez as Leandro Alcuar
 Carl Guevara as Andrew Alfonso

Recurring cast
 Krystal Reyes as Janella Perez
 Glenda Garcia as Melinda "Miling" Almazan
 Sharmaine Suarez as Rebecca "Becca" Perez
 Frencheska Farr as Diana 
 Djanin Cruz as Paula
 Jacky Woo as Genki Cheng
 Carlo Gonzales as Oscar
 Rap Fernandez as Ronald
 Menggie Cobarrubias as Ramon Alcuar
 Anna Marin as Raquel Villerte
 Zandra Summer as Amy
 Lolli Mara as Luisa Alcuar
 Marco Alcaraz as Digoy
 Arny Ross as Bella Caravide
 Lenlen Frial as Lizzy Almazan

Production and development
From the creative engineering of RJ Nuevas, the series was conceived late 2012. Early in its development, the series was titled "Tatlong Ina, Isang Anak" (lit. Three Mothers, One Child). It was changed to Bukod Kang Pinagpala (lit. You're the Most Blessed One, a phrase usually referring to Mama Mary), following its concept "The greatest kind of love is the love a mother has for her child." Winnie Hollis-Reyes served as the executive producer, while Don Michael Perez assigned to direct the show.

The majority of the ensemble cast was personally chosen by the network and assembled from December 2012 to January 2013. Actresses Camille Prats, Jackie Rice and Jennica Garcia headlined the show as the three mothers fighting for the custody of a child – Lara, played by Mona Louise Rey. The said role was originally meant for Jillian Ward but later replaced by Rey because "She's more fit for the role." Mark Anthony Fernandez, who had previously worked with Prats and Rey on the 2011 hit primetime series Munting Heredera, was cast as the sole male lead.

As the show progressed, numerous recurring casts appeared. Carl Guevarra, Krystal Reyes, singer-actress Frencheska Farr and Japanese actor/producer Jacky Woo signed on to portray four important characters in the show. Glenda Garcia, Sharmaine Suarez and Anna Marin took the parental roles and made several appearances throughout the series' run. Series' director Don Michael Perez stated that "despite the series' title, no "chosen" character is given more exposure than the other members of the cast, from writing to the directing."

Filming of the series began on February 1, 2013. Most of the series' scenes, including the fictional "Alcuar Farm" and "Bessie's Organic Farm & Restaurant", were shot on location in Tagaytay.

Ratings
According to AGB Nielsen Philippines' Mega Manila household television ratings, the pilot episode of Bukod Kang Pinagpala earned a 16.6% rating. While the final episode scored a 12.4% rating.

References

External links
 

2013 Philippine television series debuts
2013 Philippine television series endings
Filipino-language television shows
GMA Network drama series
Television shows set in the Philippines